= Murde =

Village in Maharashtra

- Village
- Interactive map of Murde
- Location within Maharashtra Location within India
- Coordinates: 17°46′29″N 73°23′23″E
- Country: India
- State: Maharashtra

Murde is a small village in Ratnagiri district, Maharashtra state, in Western India. The 2011 Census of India recorded a total of 1,957 residents in the village. Murde's geographical area is approximately 769 hectares (1,900 acres).
